The 2003 WGC-NEC Invitational was a golf tournament that was contested from August 21–24, 2003 over the South Course at Firestone Country Club in Akron, Ohio. It was the fifth WGC-NEC Invitational tournament, and the second of four World Golf Championships events held in 2003.

Darren Clarke won the tournament to capture his first WGC-NEC Invitational and his second World Golf Championships title.

Field
1. 2003 United States and International Presidents Cup teams
United States: Chris DiMarco (3,4), Fred Funk (3,4), Jim Furyk (2,3,4,5), Jay Haas (3,4), Charles Howell III (3,4,5), Jerry Kelly (3,4), Justin Leonard (3,4), Davis Love III (2,3,4,5), Phil Mickelson (2,3,4), Kenny Perry (3,4,5), David Toms (2,3,4,5), Tiger Woods (2,3,4,5)
International: Robert Allenby (3,4), Stuart Appleby (3,4), K. J. Choi (3,4), Tim Clark, Ernie Els (3,4,5), Retief Goosen (3,4), Stephen Leaney (3,4,5), Peter Lonard (3,4), Adam Scott (3,4), Nick Price (3,4), Vijay Singh (3,4,5), Mike Weir (3,4,5)

2. 2002 United States and European Ryder Cup teams
United States: Paul Azinger, Mark Calcavecchia, Stewart Cink, Scott Hoch (3,4), Hal Sutton, Scott Verplank (3,4)
David Duval did not play.
Europe: Thomas Bjørn (3,4,5), Darren Clarke (3,4), Niclas Fasth, Pierre Fulke, Sergio García (3,4), Pádraig Harrington (3,4,5), Bernhard Langer (5), Paul McGinley, Colin Montgomerie (3,4,5), Jesper Parnevik, Phillip Price (3,4,5), Lee Westwood

3. Top 50 from the Official World Golf Ranking as of August 11
Rich Beem (4), Ángel Cabrera (4), Michael Campbell (4), Paul Casey (4,5), Fred Couples (4,5), Ben Curtis (4,5), Bob Estes (4), Nick Faldo, Brad Faxon (4), Trevor Immelman, Freddie Jacobson (4), Jonathan Kaye (5), Len Mattiace (4), Rocco Mediate (4), Chris Riley (4), John Rollins (4,5), Eduardo Romero (4), Justin Rose (4), Jeff Sluman (4)

4. Top 50 from the Official World Golf Ranking as of August 18
Chad Campbell, Alex Čejka (5), Shaun Micheel (5)

5. Tournament winners of worldwide events since the 2002 WGC-NEC Invitational with an OWGR Strength of Field Rating of 100 points or more
Stephen Allan, Bob Burns, Jonathan Byrd, Ben Crane, Robert-Jan Derksen, Steve Flesch, Dan Forsman, Ignacio Garrido, Philip Golding, Peter Jacobsen, Robert Karlsson, Craig Parry, Ian Poulter, Rory Sabbatini, Gene Sauers, Steen Tinning, Kaname Yokoo
Phil Tataurangi did not play.

6. The winner of selected tournaments from each of the following tours
Japan Golf Tour: Japan Golf Tour Championship (2003) – Toshimitsu Izawa
PGA Tour of Australasia: Australian PGA Championship (2002) – tie between Peter Lonard (qualified in categories 1, 3, and 4) and Jarrod Moseley
Sunshine Tour: The Tour Championship (2003) – Hennie Otto
Asian Tour: Volvo Masters of Asia (2002) – Kevin Na

Round summaries

First round

Second round

Third round

Final round

External links
Full results

WGC Invitational
WGC-NEC Invitational
WGC-NEC Invitational
WGC-NEC Invitational